Kiwi Jr. is a Canadian indie rock band based in Toronto, Ontario. The band consists of Jeremy Gaudet (vocals), Mike Walker (bass), Brohan Moore (drums), and Brian Murphy (guitar). They are currently signed to the American record label Sub Pop.

Discography
 Football Money (2020)
 Cooler Returns (2021)
 Chopper (2022)

References

External links
 Official website

Canadian indie rock groups
Canadian punk rock groups
Canadian noise rock groups
Musical groups established in 2013
2013 establishments in Prince Edward Island
Sub Pop artists
Musical groups from Prince Edward Island
Musical groups from Toronto